This list shows the IUCN Red List status of the 77 mammal species occurring in Slovakia. One of them is critically endangered, one is vulnerable, and seven are near threatened.
The following tags are used to highlight each species' status as published by the International Union for Conservation of Nature:

Order: Rodentia (rodents)

Rodents make up the largest order of mammals, with over 40% of mammalian species. They have two incisors in the upper and lower jaw which grow continually and must be kept short by gnawing.
Suborder: Sciurognathi
Family: Castoridae (beavers)
Genus: Castor
 Eurasian beaver, C. fiber 
Family: Sciuridae (squirrels)
Subfamily: Sciurinae
Tribe: Sciurini
Genus: Sciurus
 Red squirrel, S. vulgaris 
Subfamily: Xerinae
Tribe: Marmotini
Genus: Marmota
 Alpine marmot, M. marmota 
Genus: Spermophilus
 European ground squirrel, S. citellus VU
Family: Gliridae (dormice)
Subfamily: Leithiinae
Genus: Dryomys
 Forest dormouse, Dryomys nitedula LC
Genus: Eliomys
 Garden dormouse, E. quercinus 
Genus: Muscardinus
 Hazel dormouse, Muscardinus avellanarius LC
Subfamily: Glirinae
Genus: Glis
 European edible dormouse, Glis glis LC
Family: Dipodidae (jerboas)
Subfamily: Sicistinae
Genus: Sicista
 Northern birch mouse, Sicista betulina LC
 Southern birch mouse, Sicista subtilis LC
Family: Cricetidae
Subfamily: Cricetinae
Genus: Cricetus
European hamster, C. cricetus 
Subfamily: Arvicolinae
Genus: Arvicola
 European water vole, A. amphibius 
Genus: Chionomys
 Snow vole, Chionomys nivalis LC
Genus: Clethrionomys
 Bank vole, Clethrionomys glareolus LC
Genus: Microtus
 Field vole, Microtus agrestis LC
 Common vole, Microtus arvalis LC
 Tundra vole, Microtus oeconomus LC
 European pine vole, Microtus subterraneus LC
 Tatra vole, Microtus tatricus LC
Family: Muridae (mice, rats, voles, gerbils, hamsters)
Subfamily: Murinae
Genus: Apodemus
 Striped field mouse, Apodemus agrarius LC
 Yellow-necked mouse, Apodemus flavicollis LC
 Wood mouse, Apodemus sylvaticus LC
 Ural field mouse, Apodemus uralensis LC
Genus: Mus
 Steppe mouse, Mus spicilegus LC

Order: Lagomorpha (lagomorphs)

The lagomorphs comprise two families, Leporidae (hares and rabbits), and Ochotonidae (pikas). Though they can resemble rodents, and were classified as a superfamily in that order until the early 20th century, they have since been considered a separate order. They differ from rodents in a number of physical characteristics, such as having four incisors in the upper jaw rather than two.

Family: Leporidae (rabbits, hares)
Genus: Lepus
European hare, L. europaeus 
Genus: Oryctolagus
European rabbit, O. cuniculus  introduced

Order: Soricomorpha (shrews, moles, and solenodons)

The "shrew-forms" are insectivorous mammals. The shrews and solenodons closely resemble mice while the moles are stout-bodied burrowers.
Family: Soricidae (shrews)
Subfamily: Crocidurinae
Genus: Crocidura
 Bicolored shrew, C. leucodon 
 Greater white-toothed shrew, C. russula 
Lesser white-toothed shrew, C. suaveolens 
Subfamily: Soricinae
Tribe: Nectogalini
Genus: Neomys
 Southern water shrew, N. anomalus 
 Eurasian water shrew, N. fodiens 
Tribe: Soricini
Genus: Sorex
 Alpine shrew, S. alpinus 
 Common shrew, S. araneus 
 Eurasian pygmy shrew, S. minutus

Order: Chiroptera (bats)

The bats' most distinguishing feature is that their forelimbs are developed as wings, making them the only mammals capable of flight. Bat species account for about 20% of all mammals.
Family: Vespertilionidae
Subfamily: Myotinae
Genus: Myotis
Bechstein's bat, M. bechsteini 
Brandt's bat, M. brandti 
Pond bat, M. dasycneme 
Daubenton's bat, M. daubentonii  
Geoffroy's bat, M. emarginatus 
Greater mouse-eared bat, M. myotis 
Whiskered bat, M. mystacinus 
Natterer's bat, M. nattereri 
Subfamily: Vespertilioninae
Genus: Barbastella
Western barbastelle, B. barbastellus 
Genus: Eptesicus
 Northern bat, E. nilssoni 
 Serotine bat, E. serotinus 
Genus: Nyctalus
Greater noctule bat, N. lasiopterus 
Common noctule, N. noctula 
Lesser noctule, N. leisleri 
Genus: Pipistrellus
Nathusius' pipistrelle, P. nathusii 
Common pipistrelle, Pipistrellus pipistrellus LC
Genus: Plecotus
Brown long-eared bat, P. auritus 
Grey long-eared bat, P. austriacus 
Genus: Vespertilio
 Parti-coloured bat, Vespertilio murinus LC
Subfamily: Miniopterinae
Genus: Miniopterus
Common bent-wing bat, M. schreibersii 
Family: Rhinolophidae
Subfamily: Rhinolophinae
Genus: Rhinolophus
Mediterranean horseshoe bat, R. euryale 
Greater horseshoe bat, R. ferrumequinum 
Lesser horseshoe bat, R. hipposideros

Order: Carnivora (carnivorans)

There are over 260 species of carnivorans, the majority of which feed primarily on meat. They have a characteristic skull shape and dentition. 
Suborder: Feliformia
Family: Felidae (cats)
Subfamily: Felinae
Genus: Felis
 European wildcat, F. silvestris 
Genus: Lynx
 Eurasian lynx, L. lynx 
Suborder: Caniformia
Family: Canidae (dogs, foxes)
Genus: Canis
 Golden jackal, C. aureus 
European jackal, C. a. moreoticus
 Gray wolf, C. lupus 
Eurasian wolf, C. l. lupus
Genus: Vulpes
 Red fox, V. vulpes 
Family: Ursidae (bears)
Genus: Ursus
 Brown bear, U. arctos 
Eurasian brown bear, U. a. arctos
Family: Mustelidae (mustelids)
Genus: Lutra
 European otter, L. lutra 
Genus: Martes
 Beech marten, M. foina 
 Pine marten, M. martes LC
Genus: Meles
 European badger, M. meles 
Genus: Mustela
 Stoat, M. erminea LC
 Steppe polecat, M. eversmannii LC
 Least weasel, M. nivalis LC
 European polecat, M. putorius LC
Genus: Neogale
American mink, N. vison  presence uncertain, introduced

Order: Artiodactyla (even-toed ungulates)

The even-toed ungulates are ungulates whose weight is borne about equally by the third and fourth toes, rather than mostly or entirely by the third as in perissodactyls. There are about 220 artiodactyl species, including many that are of great economic importance to humans.
Family: Cervidae (deer)
Subfamily: Capreolinae
Genus: Alces
 Moose, A. alces 
Genus: Capreolus
 Roe deer, C. capreolus 
Subfamily: Cervinae
Genus: Cervus
Red deer, C. elaphus 
Genus: Dama
 European fallow deer, D. dama  introduced
Family: Bovidae (cattle, antelope, sheep, goats)
Subfamily: Bovinae
Genus: Bison
European bison, B. bonasus  reintroduced
Subfamily: Caprinae
Genus: Rupicapra
Chamois, R. rupicapra 
Family: Suidae (pigs)
Subfamily: Suinae
Genus: Sus
Wild boar, S. scrofa

Locally extinct 
The following species are locally extinct in the country:
 European mink, Mustela lutreola

See also
List of chordate orders
Lists of mammals by region
List of prehistoric mammals
Mammal classification
List of mammals described in the 2000s

References

External links

Slovakia
Mammals
Slovakia
Mammals